Matthew Thomas Walls  (born 20 April 1998) is a British road and track cyclist, who currently rides for UCI WorldTeam .

Career
Walls won the gold medal in the men's omnium event at the 2020 Summer Olympics.

Walls was involved in an accident during the 2022 Commonwealth Games when his bike was catapulted over the barriers and into the spectators.

Career achievements

Major results

Road

2016
 1st  Points classification, Junior Tour of Wales
2018
 Flèche du Sud
1st  Points classification
1st Stages 1 & 5
 1st Stage 3 Paris–Arras Tour
2019
 1st Stage 2 Giro Ciclistico d'Italia
 2nd Overall Paris–Arras Tour
1st Stage 3
 2nd Arno Wallaard Memorial
 3rd Entre Brenne et Montmorillonnais
 10th Road race, UEC European Under-23 Championships
2021
 1st Gran Piemonte
 1st Stage 4 Tour of Norway

Track

2016
 UEC European Junior Championships
1st  Team pursuit
1st  Madison (with Rhys Britton)
 UCI World Junior Championships
2nd  Points
3rd  Team pursuit
 2nd Madison (with Matt Bostock), National Championships
2017
 1st  Team pursuit, UEC European Under-23 Championships
 1st Six Days of Berlin Under-23 (with Ethan Hayter)
 National Championships
1st  Madison (with Ethan Hayter)
1st  Omnium
2nd Team pursuit
2018
 1st  Elimination, UEC European Championships
 1st Omnium, UCI World Cup, London
 UEC European Under-23 Championships
1st  Madison (with Ethan Hayter)
1st  Scratch
1st  Team pursuit
 National Championships
1st  Omnium
1st  Team pursuit
3rd Scratch
2019
 UEC European Under-23 Championships
1st  Madison (with Fred Wright)
1st  Omnium
 National Championships
1st  Omnium
2nd Points
2nd Team pursuit
2020
 UEC European Championships
1st  Elimination
1st  Omnium
 3rd  Omnium, UCI World Championships
2021
 Olympic Games
1st  Omnium
2nd  Madison (with Ethan Hayter)

Honours and awards
Walls was awarded the Freedom of the Borough of Oldham on 8 September 2021.

He was appointed Member of the Order of the British Empire (MBE) in the 2022 New Year Honours for services to cycling.

References

External links

1998 births
Living people
British male cyclists
English male cyclists
Sportspeople from Oldham
English track cyclists
Cyclists at the 2020 Summer Olympics
Olympic cyclists of Great Britain
Medalists at the 2020 Summer Olympics
Olympic gold medallists for Great Britain
Olympic medalists in cycling
English Olympic medallists
Olympic silver medallists for Great Britain
Members of the Order of the British Empire